Deccan Chronicle is an Indian English-language daily newspaper founded by Rajagopal Mudaliar in the 1930s & currently owned by Samagrah Commercial Pvt Limited. It is published in Hyderabad, Telangana, by Deccan Chronicle Holdings Limited (DCHL). The newspaper's name derives from the originating place, the Deccan regions of India. Deccan Chronicle has eight editions in Andhra Pradesh and Telangana. They also publish from Chennai and Bengaluru.

In 2007 and 2008, DCHL launched its new business divisions. New online initiatives in the sports, education, matrimony, robotics, campus news paper for schools and colleges, and jobs.J.Krishnan was appointed the head of new business initiatives, and the CEO of Netlink Technologies (Fully owned subsidiary of DCHL) and Deccan Chargers. Vivek Kumar and Bibhuti Acharya were heading the new business divisions.

The DCHL is owned by Samagrahah in terms of the duly approved Resolution Plan.

Deccan Chargers
The Indian Premier League cricket franchise of the Hyderabad Deccan Chargers was owned by Deccan Chronicle. The Deccan Chargers represented the city of Hyderabad in the Indian Premier League. Gayatri Reddy and WPP GroupM were the owner of Deccan Chargers.

The DCHL (and its defunct Deccan Chargers) is owned by Samgrahah & Committee of Creditors.

See also
Financial Chronicle – published by Deccan Chronicle and International Herald Tribune
List of newspapers in India by circulation
List of newspapers in the world by circulation
List of newspapers in India

References

External links
 
 
 

English-language newspapers published in India
Indian Premier League franchise owners
Newspapers published in Hyderabad
Newspapers established in 1938
1938 establishments in India
Newspapers published in Coimbatore
Daily newspapers published in India